Japanese people in China (also known as Japanese-Chinese or Sino-Japanese) are Japanese expatriates and emigrants and their descendants residing in Greater China. In October 2018, there were 171,763 Japanese nationals living in the People's Republic of China (excluding the special administrative regions of Hong Kong and Macau), and 24,280 Japanese nationals living in the Republic of China (Taiwan).

History 

From 630 to 894 AD, Japan sent nineteen diplomatic missions to China started by Emperor Jomei. During this time, many Japanese doctors studied Traditional Chinese Medicine, as well as many artists learning Chinese art techniques that would be brought to Japan. It is known that a third of the Japanese sent to China during missions did not return home. Tang dynasty China received 11 Japanese dancers as tribute from Balhae in year 777.

Second Sino-Japanese War 
During the Second Sino-Japanese War, the Japanese government introduced a plan to settle 5 million Japanese in Manchukuo. However, following the end of the war, approximately 2,800 Japanese orphans in China were left behind by families repatriating back to Japan. 

Because they had children fathered by Chinese men, the Japanese women were not allowed to bring their children back with them to Japan so most of them stayed, as the Japanese law only allowed children fathered by Japanese men to become Japanese citizens.

21st century 
In 2000s, more Japanese were coming to China due to its opening up and economic reforms, and Japanese nationals living in China increased roughly three times from 46,000 to 140,134 in proportion to the growth in trade volume between the two countries. 

The 2010 Census of the People's Republic of China recorded 66,159 foreign nationals from Japan residing in Mainland China (figure excluding Hong Kong and Macau), representing nearly half of the Japanese Foreign Affairs Ministry figure. The number of Japanese emigrants to China and their descendants are unknown. However, the peak was 2012 and recently decreasing. In 2018, the permanent resident ratio is only 2.7%.

As of October 2018, the number of Japanese nationals living in China is 140,134 (excluding 25,705 in Hong Kong and 4,200 in Macau) according to a report by the Japanese Ministry of Foreign Affairs, the third largest group of Japanese people outside Japan after the United States and Brazil. 

Shanghai has the largest concentration of Japanese nationals in Greater China. As of October 2018, 40,747 Japanese nationals are living in Shanghai. The second-largest concentrated city is Hong Kong and the third is Taipei.

Education

The following are approved by the Japanese Ministry of Education (MEXT):

Mainland China
 Full-time nihonjin gakko:
 Beijing: Japanese School of Beijing
 Guangdong
 Guangzhou Japanese School
 Shenzhen Japanese School
 Jiangsu: Suzhou Japanese School
 Liaoning: Dalian Japanese School
 Shandong: Qingdao Japanese School (青島日本人学校)
 Shanghai: Shanghai Japanese School
 Tianjin: Tianjin Japanese School (天津日本人学校)
 Zhejiang: Hangzhou Japanese School (杭州日本人学校)
Supplementary Japanese language education programs (hoshu jugyo ko or hoshuko):
 Guangdong:
 Shenzhen Saturday School (深圳(ｼﾝｾﾝ)補習授業校 Shinsen Hoshū Jugyō Kō, formerly SHENZHEN日本人補習校) – Office on the 8th floor of the Jinsanjiao Building (金三角大厦/金三角大廈) in Baishizhou, Nanshan District. Previously based in the Ming Wah International Convention Centre (明华国际会议中心) in Shekou.
 Zhuhai Japanese Saturday School (珠海日本人補習校) – classes at QSI International School of Zhuhai
 Jiangsu:
 Nanjing Japanese Saturday School (南京補習授業校 Nankin Hoshū Jugyō Kō) – Nanjing International School, Qixia District, Nanjing
 Wuxi Japanese Saturday School (無錫(ﾑｼｬｸ)補習授業校 Mujaku Hoshū Jugyō Kō) – Wuxi New Area – Established 14 April 2006
 Liaoning: Shenyang Saturday School (瀋陽補習授業校 Shenyan Hoshū Jugyō Kō) – It was established in April 2006 and is in Shenhe District, Shenyang
 Zhejiang: Ningbo Saturday School (寧波(ﾆﾝﾎﾞｰ)補習授業校 Ninbō Hoshū Jugyō Kō)
 Former hoshuko:
Jiangsu: Suzhou – Held at the Suzhou Foreign Language School (苏州外国语学校) in Suzhou New District
Shandong: Qingdao

Hong Kong
 Hong Kong Japanese School (nihonjin gakko)
 Hong Kong Japanese Supplementary School (HKJSS; 香港日本人補習授業校 Honkon Nihonjin Hoshū Jugyō Kō)

Republic of China (Taiwan)
 Kaohsiung Japanese School
 Taichung Japanese School
 Taipei Japanese School

Unrecognized by MEXT:
 Chengdu Hoshuko (成都日本語補習校 Chentū Nihongo Hoshūkō) – Wuhou District, Chengdu, established on 12 February 2012

Notable people 
 Chinese people of Japanese descent

 Chiang Wei-kuo (originally from Tokyo)
 Hiro Saga – wife of Prince Pujie, brother of the Emperor Puyi (originally from Tokyo)
 Huisheng – princess of the Qing ruling family
 Jiang Ying – renowned opera singer and music educator
 Koxinga – Ming dynasty general
 Zheng Pingru – socialite and spy who gathered intelligence on the Imperial Japanese Army

 Japanese expatriates in China

 Chikada Rikimaru, Mika Hashizume, and Santa Uno – members of Into1
 Chikada Rikimaru (originally from Itami, Hyōgo)
 Mika Hashizume – Japanese American
 Santa Uno (originally from Nagoya, Aichi)
  – Japanese actor in China (originally from Edogawa-ku, Tokyo)
 Ryo Takeuchi – film director (originally from Abiko, Chiba)

See also 
 Chinese people in Japan
 Japanese diaspora
 Japanese community of Shanghai
 Japanese people in Hong Kong
 Koreans in China

References 

 
China
 
Ethnic groups in China